The Iroquois men's national under-19 lacrosse team represents the Iroquois Confederacy in international field lacrosse competitions. They are currently ranked third in the world by the World Lacrosse and have won three straight Bronze medals.

Under-19 World Lacrosse Championship

Overall results

1992

1996

1999

2003

2008

2012

2016

2022

Awards

Other tournaments and games

1990s

2010s

References

External links
Iroquois Nationals

Lacrosse of the Iroquois Confederacy
National lacrosse teams
National sports teams of the Iroquois Confederacy